Hiroomi (written: 博臣, 宏臣, 広臣 or 裕臣) is a masculine Japanese given name. Notable people with the name include:

, Japanese judoka
, Japanese motorcycle racer
, Japanese freestyle skier
, Japanese singer and actor
, Japanese physicist
, Japanese long jumper

See also
Hiromi (disambiguation)

Japanese masculine given names